Methoxy arachidonyl fluorophosphonate, commonly referred as MAFP, is an irreversible active site-directed enzyme inhibitor that inhibits nearly all serine hydrolases and serine proteases.  It inhibits phospholipase A2 and fatty acid amide hydrolase with special potency, displaying IC50 values in the low-nanomolar range. In addition, it binds to the CB1 receptor in rat brain membrane preparations (IC50 = 20 nM), but does not appear to agonize or antagonize the receptor, though some related derivatives do show cannabinoid-like properties.

See also
 DIFP – diisopropyl fluorophosphate, a related inhibitor
 IDFP – isopropyl dodecylfluorophosphonate, another related inhibitor with selectivity for FAAH and MAGL
 Activity-based probes

References

Cannabinoids
Phosphonofluoridates
Serine protease inhibitors
Arachidonyl compounds